Ivan Dodig and Lovro Zovko were the defending champions but Dodig not to participate.
As a result, Zovko partnered up with Adrian Ungur, but they lost to Sadik Kadir and Purav Raja 2–6, 3–6 in the first round.
Martin Fischer and Philipp Oswald defeated Jeff Coetzee and Andreas Siljeström 6–7(5), 7–5, [10–6] in the final to win the tournament.

Seeds

Draw

Draw

References
 Main Draw

Alessandria Challenger - Doubles
Alessandria Challenger